Dorothea Coelho is an American game show host. She was the host of Animal Planet's Who Gets the Dog? and before that the G4 program Players.

Coelho was raised in Palo Alto, California and Boston.

External links

Year of birth missing (living people)
Living people
Place of birth missing (living people)
American game show hosts
People from Palo Alto, California
People from Boston
21st-century American women